Quigley is a surname.

Quigley may also refer to:

Quigley, Montana
Heatter-Quigley Productions, an American television production company, co-founded by Bob Quigley
Quigley (film), a 2003 film starring Gary Busey
Quigley (musician), American musician
 USCGC Quigley, a United States Coast Guard Cutter in commission from 1919 to 1922 which previously served as the United States Navy submarine chaser 
The Quigley, a water obstacle at Marine Corps Officer Candidates School

See also
The Ultimate Solution of Grace Quigley, a film starring Katharine Hepburn and Nick Nolte
Quigley Down Under, a 1990 film starring Tom Selleck